Laz or LAZ may refer to:

People
 Laz people of the Black Sea area
Laz language

First name
Laz Alonso (born 1975), American actor
Laz Barrera (1924–1991), Cuban-born American racehorse trainer
Laz-D (born 1982), American rapper
Laz Díaz (born 1963), American baseball umpire

Surname
 Don Laz (1929–1997), American pole vaulter
 Wolfgang Laz (1514–1565), Austrian humanist
 Jesse Laz (born 1983), American musician with the band Locksley

Places
Czech Republic
 Láz (Příbram District)
 Láz (Třebíč District)

France
 Laz, Finistère

Germany
 Lohsa

Iran
 Laz, Iran, a village in Hormozgan Province

Montenegro
 Laz, Montenegro

Poland
 Łaz, Masovian Voivodeship
 Łaz, Żary County
 Łaz, Zielona Góra County

Romania
 Laz (river), Arad County
 Laz, a village in Săsciori Commune, Alba County
 Laz, a village in Vințu de Jos Commune, Alba County
 Laz, a village in Dezna Commune, Arad County
 Laz-Firtănuș and Laz-Șoimuș, villages in Avrămești Commune, Harghita County

Other uses
 .laz computer file format, used to compress and transfer Lidar data, used interchangeably with the .las format.
Laz language, spoken by the Laz people of Turkey and Georgia
 LAZ, ICAO code for Balkan Bulgarian Airlines
 LAZ, brand name for the Lviv Bus Factory
 Laz, wife of the Babylonian god Nergal
 Laz Lackerson, a fictional character in the television series Life on a Stick

See also
Lazu (disambiguation)
Lazarus (disambiguation)

Language and nationality disambiguation pages